SoCal Sessions is an acoustic album by P.O.D. It was released on November 12, 2014. The album contains 12 acoustic tracks from their previous studio albums: The Fundamental Elements of Southtown, Satellite, Payable on Death, Testify, When Angels & Serpents Dance, and Murdered Love.

Background
Singer Sonny Sandoval stated on the background of the acoustic album, "We were jamming like this 22 years ago just for fun... So you kind of go through your catalog of songs that you could do acoustically and there is a handful of songs that we were doing that were fun so we wanted to get something out there for fun."
The album was crowdfunded through PledgeMusic.

Track listing

Charts

References 

P.O.D. albums
2014 albums